Voriini is a tribe of flies in the family Tachinidae. More junior homonyms exist of Wagneria than any other animal genus name.

Genera
Actinochaetopteryx Townsend, 1927
Actinoplagia Blanchard, 1940
Aldrichiopa Guimarães, 1971
Aldrichomyia Özdikmen, 2006
Alexogloblinia Cortés, 1945
Allothelaira Villeneuve, 1915
Alpinoplagia Townsend, 1931
Argyromima Brauer & von Bergenstamm, 1889
Arrhinactia Townsend, 1927
Ateloglutus Aldrich, 1934
Athrycia Robineau-Desvoidy, 1830
Bahrettinia Özdikmen, 2007
Blepharomyia Brauer & von Bergenstamm, 1889
Calcager Hutton, 1901
Calcageria Curran, 1927
Campylocheta Rondani, 1859
Cesamorelosia Koçak & Kemal, 2010
Chaetodemoticus Brauer & von Bergenstamm, 1891
Chaetonopsis Townsend, 1915
Chaetoplagia Coquillett, 1895
Chaetovoria Villeneuve, 1920
Chiloclista Townsend, 1931
Cockerelliana Townsend, 1915
Comyopsis Townsend, 1919
Coracomyia Aldrich, 1934
Cowania Reinhard, 1952
Cyrtophleba Rondani, 1856
Dexiomimops Townsend, 1926
Dischotrichia Cortés, 1944
Doliolomyia Reinhard, 1975
Elfriedella Mesnil, 1957
Engeddia Kugler, 1977
Eriothrix Meigen, 1803
Eulasiona Townsend, 1892
Euptilopareia Townsend, 1916
Feriola Mesnil, 1957
Ganopleuron Aldrich, 1934
Goniochaeta Townsend, 1891
Halydaia Egger, 1856
Haracca Richter, 1995
Heliaea Curran, 1934
Homohypochaeta Townsend, 1927
Hyleorus Aldrich, 1926
Hypochaetopsis Townsend, 1915
Hypovoria Villeneuve, 1913
Hystricovoria Townsend, 1928
Itamintho Townsend, 1931
Kirbya Robineau-Desvoidy, 1830
Klugia Robineau-Desvoidy, 1863
Leptomacquartia Townsend, 1919
Leptothelaira Mesnil & Shima, 1979
Meledonus Aldrich, 1926
Meleterus Aldrich, 1926
Metaplagia Coquillett, 1895
Metopomuscopteryx Townsend, 1915
Micronychiops Townsend, 1915
Microplagia Townsend, 1915
Minthoplagia Townsend, 1915
Muscopteryx Townsend, 1892
Myiochaeta Cortés, 1967
Myioclura Reinhard, 1975
Myiophasiopsis Townsend, 1927
Nanoplagia Villeneuve, 1929
Nardia Cerretti, 2009
Neochaetoplagia Blanchard, 1963
Neocyrtophoeba Vimmer & Soukup, 1940
Neopaedarium Blanchard, 1943
Neosolieria Townsend, 1927
Neotrafoiopsis Townsend, 1931
Nephochaetona Townsend, 1919
Nephoplagia Townsend, 1919
Nothovoria Cortés & González, 1989
Pachynocera Townsend, 1919
Paedarium Aldrich, 1926
Parahypochaeta Brauer & von Bergenstamm, 1891
Parodomyiops Townsend, 1935
Periscepsia Gistel, 1848
Peteina Meigen, 1838
Phaeodema Aldrich, 1934
Phasiophyto Townsend, 1919
Phyllomya Robineau-Desvoidy, 1830
Piriona Aldrich, 1928
Plagiomima Brauer & von Bergenstamm, 1891
Plagiomyia Curran, 1927
Polygaster Wulp, 1890
Polygastropteryx Mesnil, 1953
Prosenactia Blanchard, 1940
Prosheliomyia Brauer & von Bergenstamm, 1891
Prosopochaeta Macquart, 1851
Pseudodexia Brauer & von Bergenstamm, 1891
Reichardia Karsch, 1886
Rhamphina Macquart, 1835
Rhombothyria Wulp, 1891
Solomonilla Özdikmen, 2007
Spathidexia Townsend, 1912
Spiroglossa Doleschall, 1858
Squamomedina Townsend, 1934
Stenodexia Wulp, 1891
Stomina Robineau-Desvoidy, 1830
Subfischeria Villeneuve, 1937
Thelaira Robineau-Desvoidy, 1830
Thelairodes Wulp, 1891
Thryptodexia Malloch, 1926
Trafoia Brauer & von Bergenstamm, 1893
Trichodischia Bigot, 1885
Trichopyrrhosia Townsend, 1927
Trismegistomya Reinhard, 1967
Trochilochaeta Townsend, 1940
Trochilodes Coquillett, 1903
Uclesia Girschner, 1901
Uclesiella Malloch, 1938
Velardemyia Valencia, 1972
Voria Robineau-Desvoidy, 1830
Wagneria Robineau-Desvoidy, 1830
Xanthodexia Wulp, 1891
Xanthopteromyia Townsend, 1926
Zonalia Curran, 1934

References

Dexiinae
Brachycera tribes
Diptera of North America
Diptera of South America
Diptera of Asia
Diptera of Europe